The Auto Union Grand Prix racing cars types A to D were developed and built by a specialist racing department of Auto Union's Horch works in Zwickau, Germany, between 1933 and 1939, after the company bought a design by Dr. Ferdinand Porsche in 1933.

Of the 4 Auto Union racing cars, the Types A, B and C, used from 1934 to 1937 had supercharged V16 engines, and the final car, the Type D used in 1938 and 1939 (built to new 1938 regulations), had a supercharged 3L V12 that developed almost 550 horsepower. All of the designs were difficult to handle due to extreme power/weight ratios (wheelspin could be induced at over ), and marked oversteer due to uneven weight distribution (all models were tail heavy). The Type D was easier to drive because of its smaller, lower mass engine that was better positioned toward the vehicle's center of mass.

Between 1935 and 1937, Auto Unions won 25 races, driven by Ernst von Delius, Tazio Nuvolari, Bernd Rosemeyer, Hans Stuck and Achille Varzi. Auto Union proved particularly successful in the 1936 and 1937 seasons. Their main competition came from the Mercedes Benz team, which also raced sleek, silver cars. Known as the Silver Arrows, the cars of the two German teams dominated Grand Prix racing until the outbreak of World War II in 1939.

Background

P-Wagen project
Having been made redundant from Steyr Automobile, Dr. Ferdinand Porsche founded Porsche in Stuttgart, with engineering colleagues including Karl Rabe, and financial backing from Adolf Rosenberger. Unfortunately, car commissions were low in the depressed economic climate, so Porsche founded the subsidiary company Hochleistungsfahrzeugbau GmbH (HFB) (High Performance Car Ltd.) in 1932 to develop a racing car, for which he had no customer.

In 1933, Grand Prix racing was dominated by French and Italian marques Bugatti, Alfa Romeo and Maserati. In early 1933, governing body AIACR announced a new formula, with the main regulation that the weight of the car without driver, fuel, oil, water and tyre was not allowed to exceed . This was created to restrict the size of engine that could be used, with the authority estimating that this weight limit would allow around 2.5-litre engines.

Based on Max Wagner's mid-engined 1923 Benz Tropfenwagen, or "Teardrop" aerodynamic design, also built in part by Rumpler engineers, the experimental P-Wagen project racing car (P stood for Porsche) was designed according to the regulations of the 750 kg formula. On 15 November chief engineer Rabe submitted the first draft to the planning office of a racing car for the new formula, with Josef Kales responsible for the V16 engine, while Rabe also held responsibility for the chassis.

Auto Union

In 1932 Auto Union Gmbh was formed, comprising struggling auto manufacturers Audi, DKW, Horch and Wanderer. The chairman of the board of Directors, Baron Klaus von Oertzen wanted a show piece project, so at fellow director Adolf Rosenberger's insistence, von Oertzen met with Porsche, who had done work for him before.

At the 1933 Berlin Motor Show, German Chancellor Adolf Hitler announced two new programs:
The people's car: a project that would eventually become the KdF-wagen
A state-sponsored motor racing programme: to develop a "high speed German automotive industry," the foundation of which would be an annual sum of 500,000 Reichsmarks to Mercedes-Benz

German racing driver Hans Stuck had met Hitler before he became Chancellor, and not being able to gain a seat at Mercedes, accepted the invitation of Rosenberger to join him, von Oertzen, and Porsche in approaching the Chancellor. In a meeting in the Reich Chancellery, Hitler agreed with Porsche that for the glory of Germany, it would be better for two companies to develop the project, resulting in Hitler agreeing to pay £40,000 for the country's best racing car of 1934, as well as an annual stipend of 250,000 Reichsmarks (£20,000) each for Mercedes and Auto Union. (In time, this would climb to £250,000.) This highly annoyed Mercedes, who had already developed their Mercedes-Benz W25, which nevertheless was gratified, its racing program having financial difficulties since 1931. It resulted in a heated exchange both on and off the racing track between the two companies until World War Two.

Having garnered state funds, Auto Union bought Hochleistungs Motor GmbH and hence the P-Wagen Project for 75,000 Reichsmarks, relocating the company to Chemnitz.

Design
The rear mid-engine, rear-wheel-drive layout was unusual at the time. From front to rear the layout comprised radiator, driver, fuel tank, and engine. The layout would return to Grand Prix racing in the late 1950s by British manufacturer Cooper Car Company.

The problem with early mid-engined design was the stiffness of the contemporary ladder chassis and suspension. The car's turning angle changed as the momentum of the centrally mounted engine increased on the chassis, causing oversteer. All Auto Unions had independent suspension, with parallel trailing arms and torsion bars at the front. At the rear, Porsche tried to counter the tendency to oversteer by using a then-advanced swing axle suspension on the early cars.  On the later Type D, rear suspension was a de Dion system, following the lead of Mercedes-Benz, but the supercharged engines eventually produced almost 550 horsepower, which exacerbated the oversteer. 

The original Porsche-designed V16 was modified as a V12 when in 1938 the Grand Prix regulations set a limit of 3 litres on supercharged engines. Originally designed as a 6-litre, the first Auto Union engines displaced 4,360 cc and developed . They had two cylinder blocks, inclined at an angle of 45 degrees, with a single overhead camshaft to operate all 32 valves. The intake valves in the hemispherical cylinder heads were connected to the camshaft by rocker arms, while for the exhaust valves the rocker arms were connected to the camshaft by pushrods that passed through tubes situated above the spark plugs; thus the engine had three valve covers. The engine provided optimum torque at low engine speeds, and Bernd Rosemeyer later drove an Auto Union around the Nürburgring in a single gear to prove the engine's flexibility.

The body underwent wind-tunnel testing at the German Institute for Aerodynamics, a scientific organization that still exists. With the fuel tank located in the centre of the car directly behind the driver, the front-rear weight distribution remained unchanged as the fuel was used; the same location is used in modern open-wheel racing cars for the same reason. The chassis tubes originally piped coolant from the radiator to the engine, but this was eventually abandoned owing to leaks.

Racing

Development

The development of Auto Union racing cars began 1933 by specialists of Horch works. The first cars ran in the winter 1933/34, on the Nürburgring, AVUS and Monza. Further development was stopped completely in 1942.

Unlike Mercedes, who had former racing driver turned designer Rudolf Uhlenhaut, who could provide excellent feedback on the car and required developments; Auto Union were forced to create in-car measuring systems to provide additional feedback. Auto Union used a clockwork mechanism and a paper disc to record data such as engine revs while the car was being tested, allowing the engineers to study the collected data at a later date. It was found that additional work was needed on the car's cornering behaviour, as accelerating out of a corner would cause the inside rear wheel to spin furiously. This was much abated by the use of a Porsche innovation, limited slip differential, manufactured by ZF, which was introduced at the end of the 1935 season.

Co-operation between Porsche and Auto Union continued through the Types A, B and C, until the  formula ended in 1937, as engineering developments had resulted in engines producing great horsepower in lightweight vehicles, and hence high speeds and excessive accidents. Dr. Ing. Robert Eberan von Eberhorst was responsible for the new Type D car, which while still retaining the  minimum weight, also restricted capacity to 3 litres with a supercharger, or 4.5 litres without. The Type D employed a 12-cylinder engine, while the hillclimb versions, where the capacity limit was not enforced, used a different gearbox and final drive to retain the 16-cylinder engine of the Type C.

Racing results

This section includes only results of second or better.

The list of drivers for the initial 1934 season was headed by Hans Stuck; he won the German, Swiss and Czechoslovakian Grand Prix races (as well as finishing second in the Italian Grand Prix and Eifelrennen), along with wins in a number of hill-climb races, becoming European Mountain Champion.  (There was no European Championship for the circuit races that year).  August Momberger placed second in the Swiss Grand Prix.

In 1935, the engine had been enlarged to five litres displacement, producing . Achille Varzi joined the team and won the Tunis Grand Prix in Carthage and the Coppa Acerbo in Pescara (along with placing second in the Tripoli Grand Prix).  Stuck won the Italian Grand Prix (along with second at the German Grand Prix), plus his usual collection of hill-climb wins, again taking the European Mountain Championship.  The new sensation, Bernd Rosemeyer, won the Czech Grand Prix (and managed a second at the Eifelrennen and Coppa Acerbo).

Hans Stuck also managed to break speed records, reaching  on an Italian autostrada in a streamlined car with enclosed cockpit. Lessons learned from this streamlining were later applied to the T80 land speed record car.

For 1936, the engine had grown to the full 6 litres, and was now producing ; and reaching  in the hands of Rosemeyer and his teammates, the Auto Union Type C dominated the racing world.  Rosemeyer won the Eifelrennen, German, Swiss and Italian Grands Prix and the Coppa Acerbo (as well as second in the Hungarian Grand Prix).  He was crowned European Champion (Auto Union's only win of the driver's championship), and for good measure also took the European Mountain Championship.  Varzi won the Tripoli Grand Prix (and took second at the Monaco, Milan and Swiss Grands Prix).  Stuck placed second in the Tripoli and German Grands Prix, and Ernst von Delius took second in the Coppa Acerbo.

In 1937, the car was basically unchanged and did surprisingly well against the new Mercedes-Benz W125, winning 5 races to the 7 of Mercedes-Benz.  Rosemeyer took the Eifelrennen and Donington Grand Prix, the Coppa Acerbo, and the Vanderbilt Cup (and well as second in the Tripoli Grand Prix).  Rudolf Hasse won the Belgian Grand Prix (Stuck placed second).  Von Delius managed second in the Avus Grand Prix.

In addition to the new 3-litre formula, 1938 brought other challenges, principally the death of Rosemeyer early in the year, in an attempt on the land speed record.  The famed Tazio Nuvolari joined the team, and won the Italian and Donington Grands Prix, in what was otherwise a thin year for the team, other than yet another European Mountain Championship for Stuck.

In 1939, as war clouds gathered over Europe, Nuvolari won the Yugoslavia Grand Prix in Belgrade (with a second place in the Eifel). Hermann P. Müller won the 1939 French Grand Prix (and took second in the German Grand Prix). Hasse managed a second place in the 1939 Belgian Grand Prix, and Georg Meier a second in the French.

Complete European Championship results
(key) (results in bold indicate pole position, results in italics indicate fastest lap)

Cars today

Very rarely were racing cars of the period kept, as components of early cars if required were scavenged for later models and repairs. Secondly, what did remain was often scrapped to provide funds for additional development.

During the latter part of World War II, an estimated eighteen Auto Union team cars were hidden in a colliery outside Zwickau, Saxony, where the Auto Union race shop was based. In 1945 the invading Russian Army discovered the cars, and they were retained as war possessions. As Zwickau post-war was located in Soviet controlled Communist East Germany, what little of the Auto Union racing cars existed were shipped back to the Soviet Union, distributed to scientific institutes and motor manufacturers including NAMI for research.  The Auto Union company itself was forced to relocate to West Germany, where it was re-incorporated in Ingolstadt in 1949, ultimately evolving into Audi as it is known today.

Today, it is believed that most of the cars were probably reduced to scrap, and that no Type A or Type B cars exist today. Presently it is believed that only one Type C and three Type D cars, and a Type C/D hill climbing car remain.

The sole remaining Type C was originally left to a German museum by Auto Union, after the death of Bernd Rosemeyer resulted in only two or three of these historic cars running. Damaged by bombing during the war, its body today still shows these marks. In 1979/80, Audi commissioned restoration of the car, undertaking a preservation-level overhaul to the body, engine and transmission.

Another car was taken to Moscow to study its technology. In 1976, it was at the ZIL factory in Moscow and scheduled to be cut up for scrap metal when Viktors Kulbergs, president of the Antique Automobile Club of Latvia, brought it for the Riga Motor Museum.

After the collapse of the Soviet Union, Audi engineers authenticated the car as a 16-cylinder hill-climbing Auto Union that combined types C and D.  Audi acquired it in exchange for a replica on a condition that all non-replaceable parts were kept at original car and replica was built on replaceable parts plus one of made parts that were originally on Audi made replica. Purchase/exchange was done for undisclosed sum of money, and in 1997 commissioned British engineering companies Crostwaite & Gardiner of Buxted and Roach Manufacturing of Ower to restore the original and create the replica. The original, which now resides in the Audi Motor Museum, appears at car shows and is also demonstrated at race meetings by long-time Audi racing driver Hans Stuck Jr., son of the original driver Hans Stuck. The replica, which was unveiled at the 2007 Festival of Speed at Goodwood House, England, with Pink Floyd drummer Nick Mason as driver, is exhibited in Riga.

American car enthusiast Paul Karassik tracked down chassis No.19 in Russia, adding an original engine from a separate D-type carcass and handing it over in 1990 to Crosthwaite and Gardiner to restore to its original form. In February 2007, it was due to be auctioned by Christie's in Paris. Although expected to be the most expensive car ever sold at auction at more than $12 million, the car did not find a buyer in the sealed auction. This was because of a discrepancy that was found with the chassis and engine numbers and the fact that they did not correspond with the numbers expected to be found on the car that it was believed to be. The car went on auction in August 2009, with Bonhams estimating a sale price of around £5.5million. During Bonhams 2009 Monterey auction, the bidding stalled at $6 million, and the vehicle was not sold.

Replicas
For 2000, Audi commissioned a Type C Streamline, which in May 2000 raced around the banked curve of the famous Montlhéry circuit. Now resident in the Audi Mobile museum in Ingolstadt, the car has appeared at various autoshows around the world, including the 2009 Goodwood Festival of Speed commemorating Audi's 100th birthday.

In 2004, Audi announced the rebuilt of Auto Union Wanderer Streamline Specials. The three cars were built by European car restorer Werner Zinke GmbH. As part of the celebration, Audi Tradition commissioned a limited edition 1:43 scale model of the car, bearing the start number 17. The rebuilt cars also entered the Liège–Rome–Liège long-distance run 65 years after their original Liège-Rome-Liège runs. Two of the cars, owned by Audi Tradition, went on display in its Museum in Ingolstadt, while the third car is owned by Belgian Audi importer D'Ieteren.

Auto Union clones

In 1947, Automobiltechnisches Büro (ATB) created the Sokol Typ 650 Formula Two racer in the German Democratic Republic, using the talents of chassis designer Otto Seidan and engine designer Walther Träger (both former Auto Union employees), along with spare Auto Union parts and resembled the Type D.  As Awtowelo it was successfully tested but never raced.

Type C pedal car
In 2007, Audi announced the sale of 999 1:2 scale Auto Union Type C pedal cars. The car was designed at Munich design studio. It features hydraulic dual-disc brake and its speed is controlled by the 7-speed hub gear with back-pedalling brake function. The car was made from aluminium space frame and the aluminium body panels. The seats, framing and steering wheel have been upholstered in leather by a bag-maker, as in the Audi TT, while the spoke wheels were custom-made. The steering wheel can be removed to make getting in and out easier, as in the original. The prototype of the pedal car was unveiled at the Paris Motor Show in autumn 2006.

Auto Union Type C e-tron study (2011)
It is a version of 1:2 scale Auto Union Type C made of aluminum and carbon-look material, based on the Type C pedal car. The battery can be charged at a standard 230 volt household socket.

The vehicle was unveiled in 62nd International Toy Fair in Nuremberg.

Technical details

References

Notes

Bibliography

External links

 August Horch Museum Zwickau
 AUTO UNION Sales Brochures 1939
 AutoUnion: the cars, the drivers and the history
Film of Auto Union winning the 1937 Vanderbilt Cup Race (VanderbiltCupRaces.com)
 The legendary "Silver Arrows"
 The small workshop that created motor racing history (1931–1935)
 What's left of the Auto Unions?
THE GOLDEN ERA OF GRAND PRIX RACING   – AUTO UNION

Auto Union vehicles
Grand Prix cars
Rear mid-engine, rear-wheel-drive vehicles
Streamliner cars
Ferdinand Porsche